Mandinga is the only album recorded by Projeto Mandinga, the band created by Fred Andrade and Ebel Perrelli. Released in 2002, the album counts with Helio Silva as bassist and also counts on the participation of other famous artists, such as Naná Vasconcelos and Dominguinhos.

Track listing

Personnel
Fred Andrade: guitar, acoustic guitar, viola caipira and vocals (in "Com o pé direito")
Ebel Perrelli: percussion (except in "Com o pé direito", "Valentia buscapé" and "Fasta gado"), drums and snare drum
Hélio Silva: bass
Ranniere Oliveira: keyboards (in "Catú-Catú")
Kleyton Martins: keyboards (in "Sete")
Breno Lira: acoustic guitar (in "Mandinga") and viola caipira (in "Fasta gado")
Sérgio Campelo: flute (in "Vôte" and "Pé de boi")
Guga Beija-Flor: rebec (in "Mandinga"), fife (in "Valentia buscapé") and mouth percussion (in "Valentia buscapé" and "Pé de boi")
Mr. Jam: percussion (in "Valentia buscapé" and "Fasta gado")
Carlinhos Borges: samples and xangle loop (in "Mandinga")
Luciano Oliveira: vocals (in "Catú-Catú" and "Pé de boi")
Bruno Simpson: vocals (in "De frente pro mar" and "Valentia buscapé")
Ciranda do Baracho: vocals (in "De frente pro mar")
Lama: vocals (in "De frente pro mar")
Barachinha: vocals (in "Mandinga")

Special guests:
Naná Vasconcelos: percussion (in "Com o pé direito")
Dominguinhos: accordion (in "Xote para Silveira")
Toinho Alves: vocals (in "Fasta gado")

References

2002 albums
Fred Andrade albums
Ebel Perrelli albums